South Street is a prominent street in the Scottish city of Perth, Perth and Kinross. Queen's Bridge, completed in 1960 and opened by Queen Elizabeth II, carries South Street across the River Tay to and from Kinnoull.

Mill Street, to the north of High Street, followed shortly thereafter. South Street was originally terminated at its eastern end by Gowrie House (site of today's Perth Sheriff Court), which had an arched entrance from South Street. Upon its demolition in the early 19th century, direct access was granted to the Tay.

Notable locations on South Street
From east to west
Queen's Bridge
Salutation Hotel

Junctions
From east to west
Watergate (north)
Speygate (south)
St John Street (north)
Princes Street (south)
King Edward Street (north)
Scott Street (crosses)
South Methven (north)
King Street (south)

Vennels

The below vennels begin or end on South Street.

Cow Vennel (Canal Street to South Street) – so named because it is where people would drive their cattle onto the South Inch for grazing
Fleshers' Vennel (St John's Place to 49 South Street)
Horners Lane (South Street to Canal Street)
Meal Vennel (South Street to 164 High Street). Described in 1907 as "an old thoroughfare, presently the resort of curio dealers, and the happy hunting-ground of collectors". Several labourers lived on the street in 1911.
Ropemakers Close (South Street to Canal Street)
Weaver Vennel (from and to South Street)

Gallery

References

Streets in Perth, Scotland
15th-century establishments in Scotland